Joe Lancaster (born 14 September 1990) is the former bassist of metalcore band With One Last Breath and rock band Asking Alexandria. He currently plays second trumpet with New York Brass Band, a New Orleans style Brass Band from York.

Personal life

Lancaster is currently studying music at Leeds College of Music.

Music career

Asking Alexandria (2008–2009) 

Asking Alexandria was formed by guitarist Ben Bruce who recruited Joe Lancaster in 2008, along with singer Danny Worsnop, synthesist Ryan Binns, drummer James Cassells and rhythm guitarist Cameron Liddell, however, along with Binns, Lancaster departed from the band in January 2009 and was replaced by Sam Bettley.

With One Last Breath (2010–2014) 

Lancaster joined the band as a replacement for Jake Holmes who left the band in 2010. Since his involvement the band has been signed to Small Town Records and released their debut album titled The Fearless Ones in 2014.

New York Brass Band (2014–present) 
Lancaster played trumpet as a child, but moved to the bass guitar as a teenager. When New York Brass Band played at Glastonbury Festival in 2014, Lancaster was given a trumpet by his father, who leads the band, and played to help out with some of the sets. Since then, he is a regular feature in the band, playing two more years at Glastonbury, along with numerous other festivals and weddings.

References

Living people
English heavy metal guitarists
Musicians from Yorkshire
1990 births
Asking Alexandria members
21st-century British guitarists